Sir Harold Murray Knight  (13 August 191919 June 2015) was an Australian economist. He was the third Governor of the Reserve Bank of Australia, serving from 1975 to 1982.

He was educated at Scotch College, Melbourne (1933–1935) and Melbourne University where he was resident at Trinity College. He graduated with a Master of Commerce degree.

During World War II, Knight enlisted in the Australian Army on 1 July 1940. In 1943, he transferred to the Royal Australian Naval Volunteer Reserve, where he served on the survey ship  and was awarded the Distinguished Service Cross for distinguished service in successful survey work under dangerous conditions in the Far East.

He was appointed a Knight Commander of the Order of the British Empire (KBE) in the New Year's Day Honours of 1980.

He was the grandfather of novelist Dominic Knight, and of artist Jasper Knight, whose portrait of him was shortlisted for the Archibald Prize in 2006.

References

1919 births
2015 deaths
People educated at Scotch College, Melbourne
People educated at Trinity College (University of Melbourne)
University of Melbourne alumni
Australian economists
Australian Army officers
Australian Army personnel of World War II
Royal Australian Navy personnel of World War II
Australian Knights Commander of the Order of the British Empire
Australian recipients of the Distinguished Service Cross (United Kingdom)
Governors of the Reserve Bank of Australia
Royal Australian Navy officers